The Lo Nuestro Award for Urban Artist of the Year is an honor presented annually by American television network Univision at the Lo Nuestro Awards. The accolade was established to recognize the most talented performers of Latin music. The nominees and winners were originally selected by a voting poll conducted among program directors of Spanish-language radio stations in the United States and also based on chart performance on Billboard Latin music charts, with the results tabulated and certified by the accounting firm Deloitte. However, since 2004, the winners are selected through an online survey. The trophy awarded is shaped in the form of a treble clef.

The award was first presented in 2005 to Puerto-Rican American performer Don Omar. The same year, Don Omar was nominated for a Latin Grammy Award for Best Urban Music Album for his album The Last Don Live. Puerto-Rican American reggaeton duo Wisin & Yandel are the most nominated act, with nine nominations, and also are the most awarded, with five wins. The duo also earned the Lo Nuestro Award for Artist of the Year in the 2011 ceremony. American rapper Pitbull won Urban Artist of the Year in 2011, the same year the single "Give Me Everything" became his first to top the Billboard Hot 100 in the United States. Pitbull also won the following year and performed the main theme for the film Men in Black 3 (2012). In 2014, Pitbull was awarded again in the category. Puerto-Rican American performer Tito El Bambino is the most nominated artist without a win, with three unsuccessful nominations.

Winners and nominees
Listed below are the winners of the award for each year, as well as the other nominees.

See also
 Grammy Award for Best Latin Urban Album
 Grammy Award for Best Latin Rock, Urban or Alternative Album
 Latin Grammy Award for Best Urban Music Album
 Los Premios MTV Latinoamérica for Best Urban Artist

References

Urban Artist
Latin hip hop
Awards established in 2005